Epi ta Proso (Greek: Going Forward) was a newspaper published in Patras, Greece in 1882 by A. Eymorfopoulos. In 1896, the paper changed ownership to the hands of the Free Socialists a group of anarchists. The newspaper became their official tool and they used to promote their ideas, until 1898 when its publication stopped.

Sources
Istorika, Eleytherotypia, 24 January 2002.

1882 establishments in Greece
1898 disestablishments in Greece
Defunct newspapers published in Greece
Greek-language newspapers
Newspapers published in Patras
Publications established in 1882
Publications disestablished in 1898